Tehmina Daultana (Punjabi) is a Pakistani politician who had been a member of the National Assembly of Pakistan.

Political career
Daultana was elected to the National Assembly of Pakistan for the first time in 1993 Pakistani general election from NA-130 Vehari-II as a candidate of PML (N).

She was re-elected to the National Assembly in 1997 Pakistani general election from NA-130 Vehari-II as a candidate of PML (N) and remained as the Minister for Women Development, Social Welfare and Special Education.

She ran for the seat of the National Assembly as a candidate of PML (N) from Constituency NA-168 and Constituency NA-169 in 2002 Pakistani general election, but was unsuccessful. Later, she was indirectly re-elected to the National Assembly as a candidate of PML (N) on reserved seat for women from Punjab.

She was elected as a member of the National Assembly as a candidate of PML (N) from NA-169 (Vehari-III) in 2008 Pakistani general election. She lost from NA-168. She was inducted into the federal cabinet and was appointed as Minister for women development, Minister for culture and Minister for Science and Technology.

She ran for the seat of the National Assembly as a candidate of PML (N) from NA-169 in 2013 Pakistani general election, but was unsuccessful. She was later indirectly elected to the National Assembly as a candidate of PML (N) on reserved seats for women from Punjab.

References

Pakistan Muslim League (N) MNAs
Living people
People from Vehari District
Punjabi people
Pakistani MNAs 1993–1996
Pakistani MNAs 1997–1999
Pakistani MNAs 2002–2007
Pakistani MNAs 2008–2013
Pakistani MNAs 2013–2018
Women members of the National Assembly of Pakistan
Year of birth missing (living people)
Tehmina
21st-century Pakistani women politicians